Emblemaria caldwelli, the Caribbean blenny, is a species of chaenopsid blenny found in coral reefs around the Bahamas, Belize, Honduras and Jamaica, in the western central Atlantic ocean. The specific name honours David K. Caldwell, Director of Marineland Research Laboratory, St. Augustine, Florida in gratitude for the loan of specimens.

References
 Stephens, J.S., Jr., 1970 (1 June) Seven new chaenopsid blennies from the western Atlantic. Copeia 1970 (no. 2): 280–309.

caldwelli
Fish described in 1970